On Dangerous Paths is a 1915 American silent drama film directed by John H. Collins and starring Viola Dana, Helen Strickland and Pat O'Malley.

Cast
 Viola Dana as Eleanor Thurston
 Helen Strickland as Mrs. Thurston
 William West as 	Mr. Thurston 
 Pat O'Malley as Roger Sterritt
 Mrs. William West as	Mr. Thurston's Mother
 Robert Conness as Dr. Sinclair
 Margaret Prussing as Joan Thurston
 Johnnie Walker as Henry Mills
 Grace Williams as Miss Montgomery

References

Bibliography
 Langman, Larry. American Film Cycles: The Silent Era. Greenwood Publishing, 1998.

External links
 

1915 films
1915 drama films
1910s English-language films
American silent feature films
Silent American drama films
American black-and-white films
Films directed by John H. Collins
Edison Studios films
1910s American films